Aud Schønemann (13 November 1922 – 30 October 2006) was a Norwegian actress, regarded by many as the leading comedienne of her generation in Norway.

She was born in Østre Aker, and was a daughter of actor August Schønemann and dancer Dagmar Kristensen.

She started her acting career in 1945, and is probably best known for her role as Valborg Jensen in the Olsenbanden movies, as Marve Fleksnes' mother on the long-running Norwegian television comedy Fleksnes Fataliteter and as the janitor's wife in the comedy film Skulle det dukke opp flere lik er det bare å ringe (based on the play BusyBody by Jack Popplewell).

In 1993, she was knighted in the Royal Norwegian Order of St Olav.

Her appearance in over 50 movies is supposedly a Norwegian record.

References

External links
Obituary (in Norwegian)

1922 births
2006 deaths
Norwegian stage actresses
Norwegian film actresses
Norwegian television actresses
20th-century Norwegian actresses
Actresses from Oslo